The Maramarua River is in the north-eastern part of the Waikato District of New Zealand. It is formed by the confluence of the Mangatangi River and the Ruaotehuia Stream just north of State Highway 2 between Mangatawhiri and Maramarua. It flows through the northern part of the Whangamarino Wetland and joins the Whangamarino River shortly before that river flows into the Waikato River.

Geology 

The river first formed during the Pliocene era, approximately 3 to 4 million years ago. Originally it was a westwards-flowing river, flowing towards the Tasman Sea past Pōkeno, where the modern Waikato River flows.

See also
List of rivers of New Zealand

References

External links 
1:50,000 map

Rivers of Waikato
Rivers of New Zealand